Blake Young (born September 20, 1987 in Madison, Wisconsin) is an American motorcycle racer.

Career statistics

Grand Prix motorcycle racing

By season

Races by year
(key)

Superbike World Championship

Races by year
(key) (Races in bold indicate pole position) (Races in italics indicate fastest lap)

References

External links

1987 births
Living people
Sportspeople from Madison, Wisconsin
American motorcycle racers
MotoGP World Championship riders
Superbike World Championship riders
AMA Superbike Championship riders